Navneet Singh (born 13 September 1994) is an Indian international lawn bowler. He has represented India at the Commonwealth Games and won a medal.

In 2022, he was selected for the 2022 Commonwealth Games in Birmingham, where he competed in two events; the men's triples and the men's fours. In the fours event as part of the team with Sunil Bahadur, Chandan Kumar Singh and Dinesh Kumar he reached the final and secured a silver medal.

References 

Indian bowls players
Living people
1994 births
Bowls players at the 2022 Commonwealth Games
Commonwealth Games silver medallists for India
Commonwealth Games medallists in lawn bowls
Medallists at the 2022 Commonwealth Games